The Cotroni crime family, originally Cotrone was an Italian 'Ndrangheta type organized crime syndicate (or 'Ndrina) based in Montreal, Quebec, Canada. The United States Federal Bureau of Investigation (FBI) considered the family a branch of the Bonanno crime family of New York.

The organization was established in the 1940s by Vincenzo Cotroni, a Calabrian immigrant from Mammola. Its territory once covered most of southern Quebec and Ontario. An internal war broke out between the Calabrian and Sicilian factions of the family in the late 1970s, which resulted in the death of acting captain Paolo Violi and his brothers. This allowed the Sicilian Rizzuto faction, a Mafia crime family to overtake the Cotroni's Calabrian faction as the preeminent crime family in Montreal. Vincenzo died of cancer in 1984, followed by his brother Frank in 2004.

History

In 1924, Vincenzo Cotroni immigrated to Montreal, Quebec, with his two sisters, Marguerita and Palmina, and his brother Giuseppe; his two other brothers, Frank and Michel, were later born in Montreal. In the late 1920s, Vincenzo Cotroni attended a wrestling school where his teacher, the professional wrestler Armand Courville, ended up joining the family. Cotroni and Courville became infamous in Montreal for their roles in the "baseball bat elections" of the 1930s as the two men worked as enforcers for the Quebec Liberal Party, using baseball bats to threaten or beat up voters opposed to the Liberals. When the Union Nationale won the 1936 election, Cotroni and Courville switched their loyalties. Cotroni and Courville, for their role in the "baseball bat elections", forged political connections that ensured immunity from prosecution for decades to come afterwards.

In the 1950s, the family formed a strong connection to the New York-based Bonanno crime family, as the crime family began controlling the majority of Montreal's drug trade. In 1953, Carmine "Lilo" Galante, an influential member of the Bonanno family, arrived in Montreal and worked with Cotroni. Galante planned to make Montreal a pivotal location in the importation of heroin from overseas for distribution in New York City and across the United States in the French Connection. Police also estimated that Galante was collecting gambling profits in Montreal worth about $50 million per year. In April 1956, due to Galante's strong-arm extortion tactics, the Canadian government deported him back to the United States.

As is the norm with Mafia families, the elite status of "made men" was limited to those who were Italian or of Italian descent, with the status of associate open to those of non-Italian background. The vast majority of the "made men" originated from the Mezzogiorno (the south of Italy), but most unusually there was no rules against members from different regions, with Calabrians and Sicilians both serving in the Cotroni family. In 1975, Dr. Alberto Sabatino of the Italian Polizia di Stato testified as an expert witness at the Commission d'Enquête sur le Crime Organisé (CECO) that the Cotroni family was "exceptional" in having Sicilians and Calabrians working together. Sabationo testified: "Such a mixture of Calabrian and Sicilian gangsters does not occur in Italy". At the height of their power in the 1960s and 1970s, the Cotroni family was divided along geographical lines with each capo running a particular district of Montreal. The Sicilian Lugi Greco ran the family's operations in the west end of Montreal; the Canadian-born Frank Cotroni ran the family's operations in the Saint-Laurent district; Nicola Di Iorio, likewise Canadian-born, ran the Sorrento Gang; and the Calabrian Paolo Violi served as Vic Cotroni's deputy. The two most important non-Italian members of the Cotroni family were Armand Courville and William Obront. Obront, the "Canadian Meyer Lanksy" served as a sort of chief financial officer for the Cotroni family in charge of money laundering and stock market fraud. Courville, a French-Canadian professional wrestler who had been a close friend of Vic Cotroni since they were teenagers was known to be Cotroni's most trusted adviser.

In the late 1960s, the Cotronis had violent feuds with French-Canadian mobster Richard Blass, with Cotroni associate Joe Di Maulo doing much of the enforcing. On 7 May 1968, Blass and Robert Allard attempted an ambush of Frank outside his home; two of his bodyguards were killed but Frank escaped. The Montreal underworld was violent, with 110 gangland murders between 1963 and 1969; 70 murders occurred in 1968 and 1969. A provincial commission in 1969 blamed the murders on a struggle for control between the Bonanno family of New York City and the Magaddino family of Buffalo, but in fact much of the violence was caused by an upstart French-Canadian gang led by Blass that sought to challenge the dominance of the Cotroni family. On 4 May 1968, two of Blass's men, Gilles Bienvenue and Albert Ouimet, were murdered, and on 7 May 1968, Roger Larue, of the Blass gang was also killed. In October 1968, Di Maulo shot Blass twice, who survived his wounds.

Both Di Iorio and his deputy, Frank D'Asti, were very close to the Parti libéral du Québec. In 1969, when Pierre Laporte ran for the leadership of the Parti libéral du Québec, losing to Robert Bourassa, both Di Iorio and D'Asti donated heavily to the Laporte campaign. Laporte's two principle aides, René Gagnon and Jean-Jacques Coté, met with Di Iorio and D'Asti to pick up briefcases full of cash during his 1969 leadership bid and again in the 1970 provincial election, which was won by the Liberals. After Bourassa became premier, Di Iorio and D'Asti were recorded by police bugs in expressing the hope that Laporte would become the Quebec Attorney-General and were disappointed when he failed to secure that portfolio. However, the fact that Bourassa appointed Laporte minister of labour was considered to be a consolation prize by Di Iorio and D'Asti, and Coté promised them that the new Attorney-General, Jérôme Choquette, was friendly towards the Cotroni family.

During the October Crisis of 1970, Vic Cotroni was often mentioned in the manifestos of the FLQ, which accused Cotroni of rigging elections on behalf of the Liberal Party and being one of the exploiters of the French-Canadian working class. Cotroni did not welcome the attention that the FLQ manifestos, which were read on both the television and radio, brought to him. Frank D'Asti of the Cotroni family approached René Gagnon, an aide to the kidnapped Quebec Labour Minister, Pierre Laporte, saying that the Cotroni family was willing to help the police find Laporte before the FLQ killed him, an offer that was accepted. Laporte was not rescued and instead found murdered with his corpse stuffed into the trunk of an automobile.

In the 1960s and 1970s, Cotroni used associate William "Obie" Obront to supervise a bookmaking network in the Ottawa-Hull area that handled around $50,000 in bets per day, with 25 percent going to Paolo Violi. Obie also served as Cotroni chief banker and financial adviser, responsible for laundering money. For Montreal's Expo 67, Obie also helped the Cotronis land the meat and vending machine supply contract — most of which was tainted meat. In 1973, Obie was charged with tax fraud, sentenced to 20 months in jail, and ordered to pay $683,046 in back taxes.

In September 1974, Vic Cotroni was subpoenaed to testify at the Commission d'Enquête sur le Crime Organisé and was imprisoned for contempt after the commissioners declared his testimony to be "voluntarily incomprehensible, disconnected, vague, hazy and equivalent to a refusal to testify". Following Cotroni's imprisonment, Violi took over control of the family, and on 9 January 1975, Violi told Pietro Sciarra to go to New York to ask Philip "Rusty" Rastelli of the Bonanno family to appoint him the new boss of the Cotroni family.

Mafia war in Montreal
In the early 1970s, Vincenzo Cotroni transferred the day-to-day activities of the family to his Calabrian compatriot Paolo Violi, a capodecina together with Nicolas Di Iorio, Frank Cotroni and Luigi Greco. Cotroni's role became more that of an adviser to the younger Calabrian. Greco led the Sicilian faction of the family until his death in 1972.

Soon after, in 1973, a violent internal power struggle broke out between Sicilian and Calabrian factions in the family, notably aspiring Sicilian mob boss Nicolò Rizzuto. During the violent Mafia war in Montreal, Violi and his brothers were murdered along with others through the mid 1970s to the early 1980s, when the war ceased. By the mid 1980s, the Rizzuto crime family emerged as Montreal's pre-eminent crime family after the turf war.

The Calabrian faction continued to operate with Frank Cotroni, who had been imprisoned from 1975 to 1979, as acting boss for his ill brother after the early 1980s. When Vic Cotroni died of cancer in 1984, Frank was left as boss. Frank Cotroni developed connections with French-Canadian Réal Simard, who became his driver and hitman. In 1986, Simard turned informant after his arrest, confessing to five murders and involvement with Cotroni. Cotroni was sentenced to eight years in prison for manslaughter in 1987.

After Simard turned Crown's evidence following his arrest in Toronto, his replacement was the boxer Eddie Melo. Like Simard, Melo was in charge of bringing strippers and video game machines from Montreal to the Toronto area. In the early 1990s, Melo took the lead in forging a cross-Canada alliance with the Commisso 'ndrina of Toronto and the East End Vancouver chapter of the Hells Angels. The police surveillance teams observed Melo frequently having meetings in Toronto with the three Commisso brothers and Lloyd "Louie" Robinson, the sergeant-at-arms of the Hells Angels East End chapter. Melo also often visited Vancouver, where he was greeted with much respect during his visits to the clubhouse of the East End chapter.

Frank Cotroni died, of brain cancer, in August 2004, leaving the Rizzuto Sicilian faction as the most powerful crime family in Canada.

On 4 November 2012, Joe Di Maulo, a longtime ally of the Cotroni family, was murdered outside his Montreal home. Police believe his murder is part of an ongoing power struggle between the Sicilians and their rivals.

References

Lamothe, Lee and Adrian Humphreys (2008). The Sixth Family: The Collapse of the New York Mafia and the Rise of Vito Rizzuto, Toronto: John Wiley & Sons Canada Ltd.,  (revised edition)

Books

.

External links
The Cotroni Regime of Montreal Canada
Behind the Legacy a look into Montreal's most famous crime family by Wyatt Fine-Gagne

 

 
Organizations established in the 1940s
1940s establishments in Quebec
Organizations disestablished in the 2000s
2000s disestablishments in Quebec
Organizations based in Montreal
Italian-Canadian crime families
Gangs in Montreal
History of Canada (1960–1981)